Mohammed Al Jabri (Arabic:محمد الجابري; born 30 March 1991) is a Qatari footballer. He currently plays for Al-Shamal.

External links
 

Qatari footballers
1991 births
Living people
El Jaish SC players
Al Sadd SC players
Qatar SC players
Al-Khor SC players
Al-Shamal SC players
Qatar Stars League players
Association football midfielders